Travelling Companion is a 1979 Venezuelan drama film directed by Clemente de la Cerda. It was entered into the 11th Moscow International Film Festival.

Cast
 Toco Gómez as Nolasco
 Eduardo Calvo as Padre Parra
 María Escalona as Mujer de Rosalino
 Esperanza Roy as Rosa Benilde
 José Torres as José Rafael
 Bienvenido Roca as Coronel Vergara
 Julio Mota as Juan Crisóstomo Bodas, 'El Chueco'
 Ricardo Franco as Gabrielito
 Arturo Calderón as Tobías
 Alberto Arvelo as Pablote
 María García as Balbina
 Alfredo Medina as Rosalino Camacho
 Orlando Zarramera as Pitón de Rifle

References

External links
 

1979 films
1979 drama films
1970s Spanish-language films
Films directed by Clemente de la Cerda
Venezuelan drama films